High-leg delta (also known as wild-leg, stinger leg, bastard leg, high-leg, orange-leg, red-leg, dog-leg delta) is a type of electrical service connection for three-phase electric power installations. It is used when both single and three-phase power is desired to be supplied from a three phase transformer (or transformer bank). The three-phase power is connected in the delta configuration, and the center point of one phase is grounded. This creates both a split-phase single phase supply (L1 or L2 to neutral on diagram at right) and three-phase (L1-L2-L3 at right). It is called "orange leg" because the L3 wire is often required to be color-coded orange. By convention, the high leg is usually set in the center (B phase) lug in the involved panel, regardless of the L1-L2-L3 designation at the transformer.

Supply 

High-leg delta service is supplied in one of two ways. One is by a 3-phase transformer (or three single-phase transformers), having four wires coming out of the secondary, the three phases, plus a neutral connected as a center-tap on one of the windings. Another method (the open delta configuration) requires two transformers. One transformer is connected to one phase of the overhead primary distribution circuit to provide the 'lighting' side of the circuit (this will be the larger of the two transformers), and a second transformer is connected to another phase on the circuit and its secondary is connected to one side of the 'lighting' transformer secondary, and the other side of this transformer is brought out as the 'high leg'. The voltages between the three phases are the same in magnitude, however the voltage magnitudes between a particular phase and the neutral vary. The phase-to-neutral voltage of two of the phases will be half of the phase-to-phase voltage. The remaining phase-to-neutral voltage will be /2 the phase-to-phase voltage. So if A-B, B-C and C-A are all 240 volts, then A-N and C-N will both be 120 volts, but B-N will be 208 volts.

Other types of three-phase supplies are wye connections, ungrounded delta connections, or corner-grounded delta ("ghost" leg configuration) connections. These connections do not supply split single-phase power, and do not have a high leg.

Explanation 

Consider the low-voltage side of a 120/240 V high leg delta connected transformer, where the 'b' phase is the 'high' leg. The line-to-line voltage magnitudes are all the same:

Because the winding between the 'a' and 'c' phases is center-tapped, the line-to-neutral voltages for these phases are as follows:

But the phase-neutral voltage for the 'b' phase is different:

This can be proven by writing a KVL equation, using angle notation, starting from the grounded neutral:

or:

Advantages 
If the "high leg" is not used, the system acts like a split single-phase system, which is a common supply configuration in the United States.

Both three-phase and single split-phase power can be supplied from a single transformer bank.

Where the three-phase load is small relative to the total load, two individual transformers may be used instead of the three for a "full delta" or a three-phase transformer, thus providing a variety of voltages at reduced cost. This is called "open-delta high-leg", and has a reduced capacity relative to a full delta.

Disadvantages 
In cases where the single-phase load is much greater than the three-phase load, load balancing will be poor. Generally, these cases are identified by three transformers supplying the service, two of which are sized significantly smaller than the third, and the third larger transformer will be center tap grounded.

One of the phase-to-neutral voltage (usually phase "B") is higher than the other two. The hazard of this is that if single phase loads are connected to the high leg (with the connecting person unaware that leg is higher voltage), excess voltage is supplied to that load. This can easily cause failure of the load.

Commonly there is a high-leg to neutral load limit when only two transformers are used. One transformer manufacturer's page suggests that High-leg to neutral loading to not exceed 5% of transformer capacity.

Applications 
It is often found in older and rural installations. This type of service is usually supplied using 240 V line-to-line and 120 V line-to-neutral. In some ways, the high leg delta service provides the best of both worlds: a line-to-line voltage that is higher than the usual 208 V that most three-phase services have, and a line-to-neutral voltage (on two of the phases) sufficient for connecting appliances and lighting. Thus, large pieces of equipment will draw less current than with 208 V, requiring smaller wire and breaker sizes. Lights and appliances requiring 120 V can be connected to phases 'A' and 'C' without requiring an additional step-down transformer.

It is also commonly used in installations in Japan. The distribution transformer output is 200 V line-to-line and 100 V line-to-neutral, while the high-leg to neutral voltage is 173 V. This provides 200 V for both three-phase and split-phase appliances.

Even when unmarked, it is generally easy to identify this type of system, because the "B" phase (circuits #3 and #4) and every third circuit afterwards will be either a three-pole breaker or a blank.  

Current practice is to give separate services for single-phase and three-phase loads, e.g., 120 V split-phase (lighting etc.) and 240 V to 600 V three-phase (for large motors). However, many jurisdictions forbid more than one class for a premises' service, and the choice may come down to 120/240 V split-phase, 208 V single-phase or three-phase (delta), 120/208 V three-phase (wye), or 277/480 V three-phase (wye) (or 347/600 V three-phase (wye) in Canada).

See also 
 Transformer
 Three-phase electric power
 Electric power distribution
 Mains electricity
 Mains electricity by country
 Scott-T transformer

References

Footnotes

Works cited

sea.siemens.com

Electric transformers
Three-phase AC power